Nangong is a county-level city in the south of Hebei province, China.  It is administered by the prefecture-level city of Xingtai.

The city's population was 82,500 as of 2005.

Nangong county was initially created in Western Han dynasty, many locals engaged in martial arts, Nangong is famous of "hometown of martial arts".

Administrative divisions
Subdistricts:
Fenggang Subdistrict, Nandu Subdistrict, Beihu Subdistrict, Xiding Subdistrict

Towns:

Townships:
Dacun Township, Nanbiancun Township, Datun Nownship, Wangdaozhai Township, Xuewucun Township

Climate

References

External links
 Official website of Nangong government

 
County-level cities in Hebei
Xingtai